Middletown Airport may refer to:
 Harrisburg International Airport, near Middletown, Dauphin County, Pennsylvania
 Middletown Regional Airport, serving Middletown, Ohio
 Randall Airport, serving Middletown, Orange County, New York